Mickaël Colloredo (born 16 September 1980) is a retired French professional footballer, who played as a striker.

Career
Born in Lyon, Colloredo began his career with Olympique Lyonnais before going on to play for FC Sete, Chamois Niortais, Nîmes Olympique, and Gazélec Ajaccio.

References

1980 births
Living people
French footballers
Association football forwards
Olympique Lyonnais players
FC Sète 34 players
Chamois Niortais F.C. players
Nîmes Olympique players
French people of Italian descent
Gazélec Ajaccio players